Richard Ellen Byrd (born March 20, 1962) is a former professional American football nose tackle in the National Football League (NFL), who played five seasons for the Houston Oilers (1985–1989).

Playing career
Richard Byrd played football for Jim Hill High School. Byrd then played collegiately for the Southern Miss Golden Eagles football team. He then spent five years in the NFL on the Houston Oilers.

References

1962 births
Living people
Sportspeople from Natchez, Mississippi
Players of American football from Mississippi
American football defensive ends
American football defensive tackles
Southern Miss Golden Eagles football players
Houston Oilers players